KGPQ (99.9 FM) is a radio station broadcasting an Adult Contemporary music format. Licensed to Monticello, Arkansas, United States.  The station is currently owned by Pines Broadcasting.

References

External links
 

GPQ